Courias is one of 54 parishes in Cangas del Narcea, a municipality within the province and autonomous community of Asturias, in northern Spain. The monastery-Parador of San Juan Bautista de Courias is located there.

Villages 
 La Gubia
 Courias
 Retuertas
 San Pedru de Courias
 Santana
 Vaḷḷinas

References 

Parishes in Cangas del Narcea